The 2009 Italian Open – Men's doubles was a tennis tournament played on outdoor clay courts.

Bob Bryan and Mike Bryan were the defending champions, and Daniel Nestor and Nenad Zimonjić defeated them in the final, 7-6 (9-7), 6-7 (3-7), 7-6 (7-3), 6-3.

Seeds
All seeds receive a bye into the second round.

Draw

Finals

Top half

Bottom half

References

External links
Draw

Italian Open - Doubles
Men's Doubles